Fidel Barbarito is a Venezuelan musician and politician. He was Minister of Culture of Venezuela. He currently works as a research and teaching coordinator at the Venezuelan School of Planning. He teaches at the National Experimental University of the Arts, where he coordinates the Free Chair for Popular Cultures.

References 

Living people
Venezuelan politicians
Venezuelan musicians
Government ministers of Venezuela
21st-century Venezuelan politicians
United Socialist Party of Venezuela politicians
Year of birth missing (living people)